Lisa Chapman (born 18 August 1984) is an English former competitive swimmer who represented Great Britain in the Olympics and European championships.  She competed internationally in freestyle and individual medley swimming events.  She qualified as an Olympian and won a silver medal at the European Short Course Championships in 2004.  Chapman attended Loughborough University, where she also competed for the swimming team under head coach Ian Armiger.

Chapman qualified for the women's 4×100 m freestyle relay, as a member of Team GB at the 2004 Summer Olympics in Athens. She finished fourth in the 100 m freestyle from the Olympic trials in Sheffield, posting a relay entry time of 56.17.  Teaming with Melanie Marshall, Karen Pickering and Kathryn Evans in the final, Chapman posted a lifetime best and a split of 55.49 to anchor the last 50 metres of the race.  This helped the British team achieve sixth-place with a final time of 3:40.82, almost 5 seconds behind the world record set by the winning Australians.

Four months after competing in her first Olympics, Chapman earned her first career medal, a sterling silver, in the 100 m individual medley at the 2004 European Short Course Swimming Championships in Vienna, Austria (1:00.88).

On 7 November 2005 Chapman made her decision to retire from swimming, and instead pursued coaching opportunities around the pool.

References

External links
Profile – British Amateur Swimming Federation

1984 births
Living people
English female swimmers
British female freestyle swimmers
Female medley swimmers
Olympic swimmers of Great Britain
Sportspeople from Hastings
Swimmers at the 2004 Summer Olympics